The CDGSH iron sulfur domain are a group of iron-sulfur (2Fe-2S) clusters and a unique 39 amino acid CDGSH domain [C-X-C-X2-(S/T)-X3-P-X-C-D-G-(S/A/T)-H].

The CDGSH iron sulfur domain 1 protein (also referred to as mitoNEET) is an integral membrane protein located in the outer mitochondrial membrane and whose function may be to transport iron into the mitochondria.  Iron in turn is essential for the function of several mitochondrial enzymes.

The antidiabetic drug pioglitazone, in addition to binding to the nuclear receptor PPAR, also has been shown to bind mitoNEET with approximately equal affinity.

References

External links
 
Protein domains